"God's Children" is a song written by Ray Davies and performed by The Kinks. It was released as a single in 1971 and also on the soundtrack album of the film Percy.

The theme of "God's Children" is the limits of technology, inspired by the penis transplant subject matter of the Percy film.  Music critic Johnny Rogan described the melody of "God's Children" as "spellbinding." Ray Davies sings the lead vocal.  The song uses acoustic instrumentation, accompanied by an orchestral arrangement by Stanley Myers.

Dave Davies praised the song as "phenomenal, an amazing song which is timeless and if you play it now it could sit quite comfortably in any decade." Kinks organist John Gosling regards "God's Children" as one of his three favorite Kinks' songs. Rogan has stated that Davies' "plea for a return to Edenic innocence was powerful and moving and arguably the closest he has come to writing a religious song." Billboard Magazine described the song as "a potent lyric ballad set to a rock beat" and regarded it as a "strong entry for Top 40, FM and Hot 100."  However, the single's success was hampered by lack of promotion by the label, and lack of live concert support from the band.

"God's Children" has been included on some Kinks compilation albums such as The Kink Kronikles.

A 25-second instrumental from the song entitled "God's Children - End" is used as the concluding track of Percy.

References

The Kinks songs
Songs written by Ray Davies
1971 songs
Song recordings produced by Ray Davies
Pye Records singles